Miękowo may refer to the following places:
Miękowo, Greater Poland Voivodeship (west-central Poland)
Miękowo, Goleniów County in West Pomeranian Voivodeship (north-west Poland)
Miękowo, Szczecinek County in West Pomeranian Voivodeship (north-west Poland)